Teghra is a village in Bihiya block of Bhojpur district in Bihar, India. As of 2011, its population was 3,049, in 420 households. It is located northeast of Bihiya, at a crossroads, with one road running north–south from Jhaua to Jagdishpur and the other running east–west from Arrah to Shahpur.

References 

Villages in Bhojpur district, India